In mathematical analysis, the Bohr–Mollerup theorem is a theorem proved by the Danish mathematicians Harald Bohr and Johannes Mollerup.

as the only positive function , with domain on the interval , that simultaneously has the following three properties:

 , and
  is logarithmically convex.

A treatment of this theorem is in Artin's book The Gamma Function, which has been reprinted by the AMS in a collection of Artin's writings.

The theorem was first published in a textbook on complex analysis, as Bohr and Mollerup thought it had already been proved.

The theorem admits a far-reaching generalization to a wide variety of functions (that have convexity or concavity properties of any order).

Statement

Proof
From  we can establish

The purpose of the stipulation that  forces the  property to duplicate the factorials of the integers so we can conclude now that  if  and if  exists at all.

Thus, we know that

After simplifying using the various properties of the logarithm, and then exponentiating (which preserves the inequalities since the exponential function is monotonically increasing) we obtain

From previous work this expands to

and so

The last line is a strong statement. Each single inequality stands alone and may be interpreted as an independent statement. In particular, if we keep  for the RHS and choose  for the LHS we get:

It is evident from this last line that a function is being sandwiched between two expressions, a common analysis technique to prove various things such as the existence of a limit, or convergence. Let :

so the left side of the last inequality is driven to equal the right side in the limit and

is sandwiched in between. This can only mean that

In the context of this proof this means that

And the final critical part of the proof is to remember that the limit of a sequence is unique. This means that for any choice of  only one possible number  can exist.

The remaining loose end is the question of proving that  makes sense for all  where

exists.  The problem is that our first double inequality

was constructed with the constraint . If, say,  then the fact that  is monotonically increasing would make , contradicting the inequality upon which the entire proof is constructed. However,

which demonstrates how to bootstrap  to all values of  where the limit is defined.

See also 
 Wielandt theorem

References

Gamma and related functions
Theorems in complex analysis